The 1941 Kentucky Wildcats football team was an American football team that represented the University of Kentucky in Southeastern Conference (SEC) during the 1941 college football season. In their fourth season under head coach Albert D. Kirwan, the Wildcats compiled a 5–4 record (0–4 against SEC opponents) and were outscored by a total of 154 to 151. The team played its home games at McLean Stadium in Lexington, Kentucky.

Schedule

References

Kentucky
Kentucky Wildcats football seasons
Kentucky Wildcats football